Barry Joseph O'Driscoll (born 18 September 1943) is an Irish doctor and former rugby union international. He came from a rugby family - his brother John, cousin Frank and Frank's son Brian also all played rugby union for Ireland.

References

1943 births
Living people
Irish rugby union players
20th-century Irish medical doctors
Barry
Ireland international rugby union players
Irish Exiles non-playing staff
Lancashire County RFU players
Manchester Rugby Club players
Irish expatriate sportspeople in England
Irish expatriate rugby union players
Expatriate rugby union players in England